Abdirahman Abdishakur Warsame (born 1968) is a Somali politician and a constitutional expert. He is currently the leader of the Wadajir Party. He served as a member of the Somali Parliament from 2009 to 2010, and as the Minister of Planning and International relations under President Sheikh Sharif Sheikh Ahmed between 2009 and 2010. He contested in the 2017 Somali presidential elections against Mohamed Abdullahi Farmajo. Warsame was one of the most prominent opposition politicians in Somalia, and a fierce critic of the Farmajo administration, in 2017-2022.

Early life and education

Abdirahman Abdishakur Warsame was born in Bulobarde town in Hiiraan region towards the end of 1960s. He is from the influential Habar Gidir clan. He completed his primary and secondary education in Bulobarde, before receiving a Bachelor of Law from International University of Africa in Khartoum, Sudan, Specialising in Comparative Law, in 1997. He received a Master of Laws, Specialised in Constitutions Law, from the National University of Malaysia in 2002. He also completed several courses on planning, leadership, peace building and strategic relations at the Leadership and Management Institute in London.

Career 
He was the head Imaam of Finsbury Park Mosque ,  taking over when Abu Hamza was arrested.
Before joining politics, Warsame was involved in humanitarian activities. He was one of the founders of Somali Concern Group and Somali Diaspora Conference.

He was the Executive Director of Muslim Welfare Centre, the third largest centre in the United Kingdom, between 2004 and 2007. He was editor in chief of Goobjoog News Online and a deputy chief editor with the Hiral Magazine in London.

He is a member of the Royal Institute of International Affairs (Chatham House).

He was the chief negotiator representing the Alliance for the Re-liberation of Somalia during the Somali reconciliations held in Djibouti between 2008-2009, which ultimately led to the formation of the Transitional Federal Government.

In May 2022, Cabdiraxmaan Cabdishakuur Warsame was appointed Special Envoy for Drought by President Xasan Sheekh Maxamuud.

Public service 
In 2009, Warsame became a member of the Somali Parliament. He was appointed the Minister of Planning and International Relations of the transition government in the same year.

While holding this position, Warsame was part of several diplomatic successes achieved by Somalia. For the first time in 20 years, Somalia, represented by Warsame, chaired the Arab League Foreign Ministers’ annual Summit. He was the parliament’s chief negotiator at the Kampala conference, at the end of which then Parliament Speaker Sharif Hassan and President Sheikh Sharif signed the Kampala Accord, which resolved the dispute between the parliament and the executive.

After the formation of the Federal Government of Somalia in 2012, Abdirahman became a policy advisor to President Hassan Sheikh Mohamed. He was a leading member of the London conference. He also played a part in the agreement signed between the federal government and Jubbaland. He served as a political adviser to two consecutive UN envoys to Somalia, Ambassador Nicholas Kay and Michael Keating.

Wadajir Party

Following long consultations that took place inside and outside the country, Warsame formed the Wadajir Party and became its presidential candidate in the 2017 Somalia presidential election.

He was one of 20 candidates running for the country’s presidency. After the election loss, Warsame did not leave the country like many of his fellow candidates, but remained in the country and continued to present his political philosophy and expanded the Wadajir Party. He gave numerous speeches and organised debates and seminars on state-building, democracy, as well on the shortcomings of the government, in accordance with the role of an opposition party.

Attack on Wadajir Party headquarters

On 17 December 2017, the Somali National Intelligence and Security Agency attacked Warsame and other members of the Wadajir Party, killing five security members guarding the party headquarters and injuring four others, including Warsame.

Later, Warsame would say that he did not retaliate as many expected, with some of his supporters even urging him to do so. He said he instead chose to the supremacy of the law and compromise for the sake of national interest, so he flew from the country due to threats from opposing parties

References 

1968 births
Living people
Government ministers of Somalia
International University of Africa alumni
National University of Malaysia alumni